Henry de Motlowe (died 1361) was an English-born judge who briefly held  office as Lord Chief Justice of Ireland.

He was born in Cheshire, to a family from Nether Alderley. His surname suggests that there was also a family link with the village of Mobberley, five miles from Alderley, which was called Motburlege in the Domesday Book. He owned lands at Church Lawton, (then known as Bog-Lawton): in 1338 one Ralph de Lawton gave a quitclaim for all lands which were held in Church Lawton by Henry and his heirs.

He was already a senior official of the English Crown by 1346, when he appears on a commission in London to investigate the forgery of the Royal seal. In the same year he was appointed Lord Chief Justice of Ireland but seems to have spent no more than a few months in that office, since he was replaced in the same year by John de Rednesse, and he is shortly afterwards heard of as a member of a Commission of Oyer and Terminer in Derbyshire.

In 1357 he was made a judge of the Court of Common Pleas, and in the same year he sat on another royal commission, to investigate an alleged affray between Simon Warde, a servant of John Gynwell, Bishop of Lincoln and certain members of the Order of Hospitallers, on whom Warde had been attempting to serve a summons to appear in a lawsuit. Ironically the future Prior of the Hospitallers, Richard de Wirkeley, who together with the then Prior, John Paveley, allegedly instigated the affray, had also been Lord Chief Justice of Ireland: the commission included yet another Irish Chief Justice, William de Notton.

Motlowe died in 1361.

References

1361 deaths
Year of birth unknown
14th-century English judges
People from Cheshire
Lords chief justice of Ireland